Mineiro, Mineirês, or the Brazilian mountain accent, is the Brazilian Portuguese term for the accent spoken in the heart of the state of Minas Gerais.

Etimology 
The term is also the demonym of Minas Gerais.

Demography
It is notable for being spoken in its capital, Belo Horizonte, and its historical cities: Ouro Preto, Mariana, Santa Bárbara, Sabará, Diamantina, Tiradentes, São João del-Rei, Congonhas, Serro, Caeté etc.

Ten million people, about half of the state's population, speak it.

Linguistic geography 

The dialect is mainly spoken in four geographic regions of the state. The four regions have a great population density.

 Intermediate Geographic Region of Belo Horizonte (center)

 Intermediate Geographic Region of Ipatinga (east)

 Intermediate Geographic Region of Juiz de Fora (southeast)

 Intermediate Geographic Region of Barbacena (south-center)

Most populous cities which speak Mineiro (population>50 000) 
 Greater than 700 000: Belo Horizonte (2 530 701).

 Between 600 000 and 700 000: Contagem.

 Between 500 000 and 600 000: Juiz de Fora.

 Between 400 000 and 500 000: Betim.

 Between 300 000 and 400 000: Ribeirão das Neves.

 Between 250 000 and 300 000: Ipatinga.

 Between 200 000 and 250 000: Sete Lagoas, Santa Luzia.

 Between 150 000 and 200 000: Ibirité.

 Between 100 000 and 150 000: Barbacena, Sabará, Vespasiano, Conselheiro Lafaiete, Itabira, Ubá, Coronel Fabriciano, Muriaé.

 Between 75 000 and 100 000: Nova Lima, Caratinga, Manhuaçu, Timóteo, São João del-Rei, Curvelo, João Monlevade, Viçosa, Cataguases,

 Between 50 000 and 75 000: Ouro Preto, Esmeraldas, Lagoa Santa, Pedro Leopoldo, Mariana, Ponte Nova, Congonhas, Leopoldina, Itabirito.

History

Minas Gerais was settled during the late 17th and early 18th centuries by a mix of recent Portuguese immigrants ( or ), mainly from Minho, and earlier colonists that came from São Paulo. There was an intense rivalry between the two groups, fighting over the gold mines (from which the name of the province was taken, Minas Gerais means "General Mines"). These conflicts required the intervention of the Portuguese Crown after a serious uprisal developed into civil war (Guerra dos Emboabas) with the final defeat of the paulistas in 1708.

In the 19th century, the state was being forgotten due to the decline of gold mining. Due to this isolation, the state was influenced by the dialect of Rio de Janeiro in the southeast, while the south and the Triangulo Mineiro region, began to speak the rustic dialect of São Paulo (caipira). The central region of Minas Gerais, however, developed their own dialect, which is known as Mineiro or mountain dialect. This dialect is also present in cities of the center and southest of the state, which is surrounded by mountains and mines.

Recently, the influence of mineiro has been increasing and spreading, due to local pride and rejection of other accents.

History of linguistic study 
The first scientific study of the dialect was the Esboço de um Atlas Linguístico de Minas Gerais (EALMG), "Draft of a Linguistic Atlas for Minas Gerais". The work was done in 1977 by the Federal University of Juiz de Fora. Until today, it is the most important linguistic study about the state.

Accent characteristics
Common to most of Brazil.
 Assimilation of consecutive vowels:   ("the vulture") becomes  .
Common to most of Brazil.
 Soft pronunciation of "r":   ("mouse") is pronounced . Very common in other parts of Brazil.
 Loss of the plural ending  in adjectives and nouns, retained only in articles and verbs:   ("my children") becomes (sometimes; most of the time in the capital, Belo Horizonte)  , (most of the time)   OR   (see below).
Probably the most characteristic feature of the Mineiro accent, though it is less present in Belo Horizonte.
 Replacement of some diphthongs with long vowels:   (thread) becomes  ,   (few) becomes  .
 Apocope of final syllables.   becomes  ( → ),  becomes   ( → ).
 Intense elision:   ("spread your wings") becomes  .   ("Where are we going?") becomes  . However, see : this is far from being the most common usage.
 Loss of initial "e" in words beginning with "es":  becomes .
  also lacks notable features of other accents, including the retroflex R (caipira), palatalization of S (carioca), strong dental R (gaucho), or "singsong" nordestino intonation.
This dialect is often hard to understand for people outside the region where it is spoken due to heavy assimilation and elision.

See also
 Brazilian Portuguese
 Portuguese dialects
 Portuguese phonology
 Caipira

Notes

References

Brazilian Portuguese
Demonyms
Culture in Minas Gerais